Bimal Chandra (19 November 1927 – 17 February 1998) was an Indian swimmer. He competed in two events at the 1948 Summer Olympics.

References

External links
 

1927 births
1998 deaths
Indian male swimmers
Indian male freestyle swimmers
Olympic swimmers of India
Swimmers at the 1948 Summer Olympics
Place of birth missing
Asian Games medalists in swimming
Asian Games bronze medalists for India
Swimmers at the 1951 Asian Games
Medalists at the 1951 Asian Games
20th-century Indian people